Clan Alpine was the name of at least seven ships, five of which were managed by Clan Line.

Ship names